Gatifloxacin (brand names Gatiflo, Tequin, and Zymar) is an antibiotic of the fourth-generation fluoroquinolone family, that like other members of that family, inhibits the bacterial enzymes DNA gyrase and topoisomerase IV.

It was patented in 1986 and approved for medical use in 1999.

Side effects
A Canadian study published in the New England Journal of Medicine in March 2006, claimed that Tequin  can have significant side effects including dysglycemia. An editorial by
Jerry Gurwitz in the same issue called for the Food and Drug Administration (FDA) to consider giving Tequin a black box warning. This editorial followed distribution of a letter dated February 15 by Bristol-Myers Squibb to health care providers indicating action taken with the FDA to strengthen warnings for the medication. Subsequently, Bristol-Myers Squibb reported it would stop manufacture of Tequin, end sales of the drug after existing stockpiles were exhausted, and return all rights to Kyorin.

By contrast, ophthalmic gatifloxacin is generally well tolerated. The observed systemic concentration of the drug following oral administration of 400 mg (0.01 ounces) gatifloxacin  is approximately 800 times higher than that of the 0.5% gatifloxacin eye drop. Given as an eye drop, gatifloxacin has very low systemic exposure. Therefore, the systemic exposures resulting from the gatifloxacin ophthalmic solution are not likely to pose any risk for systemic toxicities.

Contraindications
Hypersensitivity

Society and culture

Availability
Gatifloxacin is currently available in the US and Canada only as an ophthalmic solution.

In 2011, the Union Health and Family Welfare Ministry of India banned the manufacture, sale, and distribution of gatifloxacin because of its adverse side effects.

In China, gatifloxacin is sold in tablet as well as in eye drop formulations.

Brand names
Bristol-Myers Squibb introduced gatifloxacin in 1999 under the proprietary name Tequin for the treatment of respiratory tract infections, having licensed the medication from Kyorin Pharmaceutical Company of Japan. Allergan produces it in eye-drop formulation under the names Zymar, Zymaxid and Zylopred. In many countries, gatifloxacin is also available as tablets and in various aqueous solutions for intravenous therapy.

References

Fluoroquinolone antibiotics
Withdrawn drugs
1,4-di-hydro-7-(1-piperazinyl)-4-oxo-3-quinolinecarboxylic acids
AbbVie brands
Phenol ethers
Cyclopropanes
Anti-tuberculosis drugs